Assane Seck  (1 February 1919 – 27 November 2012) was a Senegalese politician from Fogny. He served as Foreign Minister of Senegal from 1973–1978. He was said to be "forced into political retirement".

Works
La Moyenne Casamance. Étude de géographie physique, 1955
(in collaboration with Alfred Mondjannagni), L'Afrique occidentale, 1967
Les grandes villes d'Afrique et de Madagascar : Dakar, 1968   
Dakar, métropole ouest-africaine, 1970 (thèse)   
Sénégal, émergence d'une démocratie moderne, (1945-2005) : un itinéraire politique (préface de Djibril Samb), 2005

Bibliography
Assane Seck, Sénégal. Émergence d’une démocratie moderne (1945-2005). Un itinéraire politique, Karthala, Paris, 2005
Momar Coumba Diop et Mamadou Diouf, Le Sénégal sous Abdou Diouf, Paris, Karthala, 1990

References

Culture ministers of Senegal
Education ministers of Senegal
Foreign ministers of Senegal
Infrastructure ministers of Senegal
Senegalese politicians
1919 births
2012 deaths